Parliamentary elections took place in the Republic of Crimea on 14 September 2014. These were the first elections since Crimea's annexation into the Russian Federation earlier that year. The outcome was an overwhelming victory for President Vladimir Putin's United Russia party.

Background
After the 2014 Crimean crisis, following the passage of a secession referendum, which international community widely saw as illegal, the declaration of independence of the Republic of Crimea from Ukraine and the process of accession to Russia that followed it, on 11 April the State Council of Crimea approved a joint appeal from Crimea and Sevastopol's Legislative Assembly to Russian President Vladimir Putin, asking him to bring forward parliamentary elections from 2015 to September 2014 "to accelerate the integration of the Republic of Crimea and Sevastopol into the system of government of the Russian Federation".

On 17 April Putin submitted a draft law on parliamentary elections in Crimea and Sevastopol to the State Duma, setting 14 September 2014 as the election date. On this day also election were held in 30 Russian regions and 14 regional (Russian) legislatures.

Electoral system
According to Crimean State Council Chairman Vladimir Konstantinov, the elections will be conducted according to a mixed system. Fifty deputies will be elected on Party-list proportional representation and 25 in majority constituencies.

Russian Central Election Commission Chairman Vladimir Churov said that the commission  filed a request for funding with the government for 400 million roubles to conduct the election.

On 9 September 2014 Head of the Republic of Crimea Sergey Aksyonov announced that Crimean residents "who did not manage to obtain a passport of the Russian Federation" would be able to participate in the elections using their "Ukrainian local registration".

Issues
The local Crimean Tatars had called for a boycott of the elections.

Opposition figures in Crimea complained that they were deprived of a chance to win seats because of "Administrative resource-tactics" that made sure unapproved challengers would have no chance of gaining traction.

Results
Only two parties overcame the election threshold: United Russia won 70 mandates of the Crimean Republic's State Council 75 seats because its candidates won in all 25 single-member constituencies and it won 71.06% of the party-list vote; the other 5 mandates went to the Liberal Democratic Party of Russia who won 8.14% of the party-list vote. The voter turnout was 53.61%.

803 candidates had tried to win seats; 108 candidates in one of the single-member constituencies and the rest as candidates as member of 12 political parties.

Opinion polls
According to a poll by August/September 2014 poll by the Crimean Academy of Sciences the United Russia party would receive 95% of the votes in the 25 in majority constituencies and about 67% of the votes on the all-Crimean party lists. 10% of the other votes on the party list were predicted to go to the LDPR (most of these voters were believed to live in south Crimea), 8% to the Communist Party of the Russian Federation (pollsters noted that their popularity (compared with three month earlier) was diminishing), 4.5% to Rodina and A Just Russia, 2,5% to Patriots of Russia and about 3% to other parties. The Crimean Academy of Sciences predicted a turnout of 80%.

References

2014 elections in Russia
2014 elections in Ukraine
Elections in Crimea
Annexation of Crimea by the Russian Federation
Regional legislative elections in Russia